Stoenescu is a Romanian surname. Notable people with the surname include:

Alex Mihai Stoenescu (born 1953), Romanian historian, writer, journalist and politician
Dan Stoenescu (born 1980), Romanian political scientist and journalist
Daniel Stoenescu (1921-after 1970), Coty-Award-winning jewelry designer for Cadoro
Dragoș Stoenescu (born 1979), Romanian water-polo player
Eustațiu Stoenescu, (1884-1957), Romanian artist
Elena Caragiani-Stoenescu (1887–1929), the first Romanian female aviator

Romanian-language surnames